= Voderup =

Voderup Voderup
- hamlet
- Location within Denmark
- Coordinates: 54°52′42″N 10°19′44″E
- Country: Denmark
- Province: Syddanmark

Population
  - Total: 23

Voderup is a hamlet in the Region of Southern Denmark, Denmark, its population is 23.
